Elusa semipecten is a species of moth of the family Noctuidae first described by Charles Swinhoe in 1901. It is found in the Australian states of New South Wales and Queensland.

The forewings are brown with a small mark near the middle of each forewing. The hindwings are pale brown.

References

External links
Original description: Swinhoe, C. (1901)."New Genera and Species of Eastern and Australian Moths". The Annals and Magazine of Natural History: 494–495.

Moths described in 1901
Hadeninae
Moths of Australia